The following lists events that happened during 1992 in Australia.

Incumbents

Monarch – Elizabeth II
Governor-General – Bill Hayden
Prime Minister –  Paul Keating
Deputy Prime Minister – Brian Howe
Opposition Leader – John Hewson
Chief Justice – Sir Anthony Mason

State and Territory Leaders
Premier of New South Wales – Nick Greiner (until 24 June), then John Fahey
Opposition Leader – Bob Carr
Premier of Queensland – Wayne Goss
Opposition Leader – Rob Borbidge
Premier of South Australia – John Bannon (until 4 September), then Lynn Arnold
Opposition Leader – Dale Baker (until 11 May), then Dean Brown
Premier of Tasmania – Michael Field (until 17 February), then Ray Groom
Opposition Leader – Ray Groom (until 17 February), then Michael Field
Premier of Victoria – Joan Kirner (until 6 October), then Jeff Kennett
Opposition Leader – Jeff Kennett (until 6 October), then Joan Kirner
Premier of Western Australia – Carmen Lawrence
Opposition Leader – Barry MacKinnon (until 12 May), then Richard Court
Chief Minister of the Australian Capital Territory – Rosemary Follett
Opposition Leader – Trevor Kaine
Chief Minister of the Northern Territory – Marshall Perron
Opposition Leader – Brian Ede
President of the Legislative Assembly/Head of Government of Norfolk Island – David Buffett (until 20 May), then John Brown

Governors and Administrators
Governor of New South Wales – Peter Sinclair
Governor of Queensland – Sir Walter Campbell (until 29 July), then Leneen Forde
Governor of South Australia – Dame Roma Mitchell
Governor of Tasmania – Sir Phillip Bennett
Governor of Victoria – Davis McCaughey (until 22 April), then Richard McGarvie
Governor of Western Australia – Sir Francis Burt
Administrator of Norfolk Island – Herbert MacDonald (until 12 April), then Alan Kerr
Administrator of the Northern Territory – James Muirhead

Events

January
2 January – George H. W. Bush becomes the first President of the United States to address the Australian Parliament.
18 January – The Labor Party wins a by-election in the central coast seat of The Entrance.
22 January – The Queensland Criminal Justice Commission announces that it won't release names of MPs who rort travel expenses.
26 January – Prime Minister Paul Keating gives his Australia Day address in Canberra, saying that Australia must adapt to a changing world and look to Asia if it was to survive economically.
28 January – Colin White and David Trimmer are charged over their alleged involvement in a multimillion-dollar tobacco scam in Brisbane.  
29 January – New South Wales Premier Nick Greiner calls for a controversial sex education book, funded by the Federal Government, to be destroyed.

February
1 February – 
A general election is held in Tasmania.
One and two-cent coins begin to be withdrawn from circulation.
6 February – Ruby Jubilee of Elizabeth II's accession as Queen of Australia
9 February – Flooding occurs in Sydney and other areas of New South Wales.  Torrential rain also floods the Sydney Harbour Tunnel with 500,000 litres of water.
15 February – The second ACT Legislative Assembly election is held, re-electing the Labor minority government of Rosemary Follett.
20 February – Scores of people flee their homes as several coastal towns north of Brisbane are hit by flash floods.
21 February – A State of Emergency is declared in Maryborough and Gympie due to major flooding.
22 February – 
After trialling Daylight Saving in Queensland for a total of three years, a referendum is held, with 54.5% of Queenslanders voting against daylight saving. Regional and rural areas strongly oppose daylight saving, while those in the metropolitan south-east vote in favour of it.
A state of emergency is declared in the whole of Noosa Shire, Queensland due to major flooding – the worst since 1968.
24 February – Queen Elizabeth II visits Australia. Prime Minister Paul Keating breaks royal protocol by placing his hand on the Queen's back, causing an outraged British tabloid newspaper to dub him the "Lizard of Oz".  In his speech welcoming the Queen, Paul Keating contrasts the current state of Australia with that of her first visit in 1954.
26 February – Prime Minister Paul Keating's long-awaited economic statement One Nation is delivered.  Federal Opposition Leader John Hewson describes it as porkbarrelling.

April
11 April – Labor candidate Phil Cleary wins the 1992 Wills by-election which was brought about by the resignation of Bob Hawke.  Former Prime Minister Malcolm Fraser attributes the result in part to revulsion against the "alien creed" of economic rationalism.
25 April – Prime Minister Paul Keating kisses the ground at Kokoda, Papua New Guinea, declaring that it, not Gallipoli, is the birthplace of Australian nationalism.
28 April – National Party frontbencher Ray Braithwaite resigns over Fightback!'s zero tariff policy on sugar.

May
2 May – New South Wales Liberal MP Andrew Humpherson wins the 1992 Davidson state by-election.
18 May – Social Security Minister Graham Richardson resigns after a month of disclosures on his interventions on a friend's behalf in the "Marshall Islands affair".
25 May – Lindy Chamberlain receives compensation for wrongful conviction on murder charges.

June
3 June – The High Court of Australia decides the case of Mabo v Queensland (No 2), a landmark decision recognising native title in Australia.  The decision overturns the concept of Australia as an unoccupied land (terra nullius) at the time of British settlement.
24 June – Nick Greiner resigns as Premier of New South Wales in the wake of a corruption scandal, and is replaced by John Fahey.

July
31 July – Janet Powell resigns from the Australian Democrats, sitting henceforth as an Independent Senator.  The Victorian branch of the Democrats fractures acrimoniously, damaging the party nationally.

August
11 August – A meeting with Prime Minister Paul Keating fails to secure for the Greens commitments on global warming, endangered species protection and biodiversity.
18 August – Budget expenditure promises on labour market and training programmes and reducing the sizeable deficit fail to halt the Keating Government's sliding popularity.
30 August – Representatives from the Tasmanian, Queensland and New South Wales Greens, with observers from other states, form the Australian Greens Party at a Sydney meeting.

September
4 September – Lynn Arnold becomes Premier of South Australia after the resignation of John Bannon after the near-collapse of the State Bank.
7 September – The National Party of Queensland launches its state election campaign in Brisbane with strong support for law and order issues.
8 September– 
Prime Minister Paul Keating warns President George Bush that wheat subsidies are corroding public support in Australia for the United States.
The Afghan Foreign Minister arrives in Sydney to appeal for urgent assistance.
19 September – A state election is held in Queensland. The Labor government of Wayne Goss is returned to power.
30 September – The High Court of Australia invalidates legislation passed in December 1991 banning political advertising on the electronic media in the run-up to state and federal elections.

October
3 October – A state election is held in Victoria. Joan Kirner's Labor government is defeated by Jeff Kennett's Liberal party.
6 October – Rose Hancock – Porteous is fined $1,000 in Perth for forging prescriptions for drugs.
19 October – One of the two men charged with the murder of Dr. Victor Chang pleads guilty.
20 October – 
The trial of the second man accused of murdering Dr. Victor Chang begins.
The Federal Opposition unveils Jobsback, its industrial relations policy designed to move from centralised wage-fixing to individual employment contracts negotiated at the enterprise level.
27 October – Senator Bronwyn Bishop attacks the Tax Commissioner over alleged special treatment to the Labor Party.
30 October – The second man charged with the murder of Dr. Victor Chang, Phillip Lim, is found guilty.

November
5 November – Prime Minister Paul Keating announces that the coming election would be a poll on the Goods and Services Tax (GST) and pledged that if the Coalition won, Labor would allow the GST through the Senate.
19 November – With the implications of Fightback! increasingly scrutinised and condemned, and elements in the Coalition "panicking", Federal Opposition Leader John Hewson declares that he would resign rather than abandon the GST.
23 November – Prime Minister Paul Keating announces the end of the ban preventing homosexual men and women from serving in the Australian Defence Force
25 November – The High Court of Australia rules that Independent Phil Cleary had been ineligible to stand for Wills as he was an Education Department employee on unpaid leave ("officers of the Crown" cannot stand for Parliament).  His Labor and Liberal opponents were also declared ineligible, as they both held dual citizenship.

December
18 December – Federal Opposition Leader John Hewson unveils Fightback Mark II which includes abandoning the GST on basic food items and childcare and the threat to cut off the dole after 9 months.
22 December – The men who murdered heart surgeon Dr. Victor Chang are each sentenced to 20 years jail.
Adelaide receives it highest annual rainfall on record, totalling .

Full date unknown
Norgate Data, a data service business, is founded.

Arts and literature
 26 January – The first Big Day Out music festival is held at the Sydney Showground, headlined by Violent Femmes and Nirvana.
 Tim Winton's novel Cloudstreet wins the Miles Franklin Award
 The first WOMADelaide is held at Botanic Park as part of the Adelaide Festival of Arts. It featured Nusrat Fateh Ali Khan, Youssou N'Dour, Trio Bulgarka and Martenitsa, Archie Roach, Crowded House & Penguin Café Orchestra

Film
23 January – Spotswood
20 August – Strictly Ballroom
12 November – Romper Stomper

Television
1 January – The Victorian television market is aggregated, with VIC TV (now WIN Television) becoming the Nine Network affiliate, Prime Television taking a Seven Network affiliation & Southern Cross Network (now Southern Cross Ten) taking the Network Ten affiliation.
4 September – Kerry Packer pulls the plug on Australia's Naughtiest Home Videos mid-air.
20 July – ABC debuts children's TV series Bananas in Pyjamas.
Ending this year were:
November – Fast Forward (program comes back as Full Frontal in 1993)
November – Acropolis Now
The Big Gig (1989–1992) on ABC

Sport
22 February – 25 March – The 1992 Cricket World Cup is held in Australia and New Zealand. Pakistan defeats England in the final at the MCG by 22 runs.
5 March – First day of the Australian Track & Field Championships for the 1991–1992 season, which are held at the Olympic Sports Field in Adelaide, South Australia.
25 March – Great Southern Stand opened at the MCG by Donald Cordner, then-President of the Melbourne Cricket Club.
6 April – Peter Sterling announces his retirement from rugby league due to injury
3 May
Adelaide City win the NSL Grand Final on Penalties after a scoreless draw with Melbourne Croatia at Olympic Park
Geelong kick the highest VFL/AFL score against the Brisbane Bears of 37.17.239
7 May – Exactly 100 years to the day of their first senior-level match, Collingwood meets Carlton in a rematch of that game at the MCG. Carlton wins by 33 points.
18 May – Auckland (now New Zealand) Warriors admitted to 1995 ARL premiership. North Queensland, South Queensland & Perth all admitted later, forming 20-team comp.
12 July – Gerard Barrett wins the men's national marathon title, clocking 2:16:46 in Brisbane, while Jennifer Dowie claims the women's title in 2:40:40.
26 September – West Coast Eagles (16.17.113) defeat Geelong (12.13.85) in the first non-Melbourne –only Grand Final, to win the 96th AFL premiership. It is the first time that the VFL/AFL premiership has left Victoria.
27 September – Brisbane Broncos (28) defeat St. George Dragons (8) to win the 85th NSWRL premiership. It is the first time that the NSWRL premiership has gone to Queensland. Broncos halfback Allan Langer is awarded the Clive Churchill medal for man of the match. Gold Coast Seagulls finish in last position, claiming the wooden spoon for the second year in a row.
30 October – NSWRL premiers Brisbane Broncos defeat RFL champions Wigan 22–8 in the 1992 World Club Challenge, held in Wigan, England. It is the first Australian victory on British soil since Eastern Suburbs Roosters' win in the inaugural 1976 match.
Brownlow Medal awarded to Scott Wynd (Footscray)

Births

2 January – Isabella Holland, tennis player
18 January – Cheyse Blair, rugby league player
20 January
Ben Kantarovski, footballer (soccer) player
Alex Keath, cricketer
24 January – Luke Russell, footballer
25 January – Casey Dumont, footballer (soccer) player
28 January – Jennifer Bisset, footballer (soccer) player
30 January – Matthew Werkmeister, stage and television actor
31 January – Tahnee Atkinson, model
3 February – Luke Keary, rugby league player
8 February – Lee Cormie, actor
9 February
Valentina Barron, actress
Kyle Feldt, rugby league player
Mitchell Frei, rugby league player
12 February – James Jeggo, footballer (soccer) player
13 February –
Chris Bush, footballer
Jake Batchelor, footballer
Nicholas Fitzgerald, footballer
16 February – Danielle Catanzariti, actress
21 February – Eli Babalj, footballer
23 February
 Corey Adamson, baseball player
 Samara Weaving, actress
29 February – Sean Abbott, cricketer
2 March – Kerem Bulut, footballer
3 March – Jordy Lucas, actress
13 March – Lucy Fry, actress
16 March – Sam Gallaway, footballer (soccer) player
22 March – Mitchell Mallia, footballer (soccer) player
23 March – Kyrie Irving, basketball player
24 March – Jenna Kingsley, footballer (soccer) player
2 April – Kurt Aylett, footballer
7 April – Petar Franjic, footballer (soccer) player
8 April – Mathew Ryan, footballer
10 April – Chaz Mostert, racing driver
18 April - Adam Cooper, footballer. 
18 April – Alexandra Adornetto, author of three children's books in a trilogy, The Strangest Adventures, and one young adult book, Halo.
22 April – Angela Fimmano, footballer
27 April – Mitch Creek, basketballer
3 May – Melissa Wu, diver
4 May – Shannon Lively, actor
9 May – Will Hopoate, rugby league player
11 May – Lawrence Thomas, footballer
14 May – Dyson Heppell, footballer
16 May – Tom Liberatore, footballer
19 May – Cassi Van Den Dungen, model
20 May – Cate Campbell, swimmer
27 May – Ruth Blackburn, footballer
1 June 
Jenna McDougall, singer-songwriter (Tonight Alive)
Amanda Ware, model
3 June – Matt Acton, footballer 
4 June – Morgan Griffin, actress
5 June 
Sam Rainbird, cricketer
Emily Seebohm, swimmer
8 June – Alex Fasolo, footballer
9 June – Boyd Cordner, rugby league player
13 June
Jack Darling, footballer
Joey Gibbs, footballer (soccer) player
14 June – Ben Halloran, footballer
16 June – Andrew Gaff, footballer
29 June – Ryan Battaglia, baseball player
7 July – Jack Le Brocq, racing driver
12 July – Larrissa Miller, gymnast
14 July – Chris Harold, footballer striker
16 July – Sam Naismith, Australian rules footballer
17 July
 Joe Costa, footballer (soccer) player
 Tom Eisenhuth, rugby league footballer
20 July – Jordan Rodrigues, actor
21 July – Marcus Harris, cricketer
26 July – Kamal Ibrahim, footballer
27 July – Alex Apollonov, YouTube personality
28 July – Bailey Wright, footballer
13 August – 
Jenny-Lyn Anderson, South Africa-born swimmer
Katrina Gorry, footballer (soccer) player
19 August – Cameron Guthrie, footballer
1 September – Ben Jacobs, footballer
2 September – Valentina Barron, actress
7 September – Martin Hinteregger, footballer
12 September – Bernie Ibini-Isei, Nigeria-born footballer
13 September – Shaun Atley, footballer
18 September 
Brendan Hamill, footballer
Edrick Lee, rugby league player
28 September – Josh Caddy, footballer
30 September – Elyse Knowles, model
2 October – Harley Bennell, footballer
7 October – Grace Bawden, opera singer
27 October – Charles Cottier, actor
2 November – Katie Daly, footballer (soccer) player
12 November – Giulietta, singer-songwriter and dancer
19 November – Cameron Bancroft, cricketer
29 November – Sophie Letcher, tennis player
12 December – Marco Djuricin, footballer
17 December – Jordan Coulter, model
22 December 
 George Horlin-Smith, footballer
 Shiori Kutsuna, Australian-Japanese actress

Deaths
 3 January – Dame Judith Anderson, actress (died in the United States) (b. 1897)
 27 March – Lang Hancock, iron ore magnate (b. 1909)
 14 April – Irene Greenwood, radio broadcaster, feminist and peace activist (b. 1898)
 7 June – Georges Mora, entrepreneur and arts patron (born in Germany) (b. 1913)
 15 June – Brett Whiteley, artist (b. 1939)
 18 June – Peter Allen, musician (b. 1944)
 21 June – Arthur Gorrie, hobby shop owner (b. 1922)
 27 July – Max Dupain, photographer (b. 1911)
 28 August – Sir Tom Drake-Brockman, Western Australian politician (b. 1919)
 6 October – Bill O'Reilly, cricketer (b. 1905)
 28 November – Sidney Nolan, artist (died in the United Kingdom) (b. 1917)

See also
 1992 in Australian television
 List of Australian films of 1992

References

 
Australia
Years of the 20th century in Australia